Schmidtea lugubris is a species of freshwater flatworm, a dugesiid triclad found in Europe.

Diet
S. lugubris preys mainly on oligochaetes and gastropods.

References

Dugesiidae